The document known as the Berber Dahir is a dhahir (decree) created by the French protectorate in Morocco on May 16, 1930. This Dahir changed the legal system in parts of Morocco where Amazigh languages were primarily spoken, while the legal system in the rest of the country remained the way it had been before the French invasion. Sultan Muhammad V signed the Dahir under no duress, though he was only 20 years old at the time.

The new legal system in Amazigh communities would ostensibly be based on local and centuries-old Amazigh laws inherited and evolved throughout the millennia of the Islamic conquest of North Africa rather than Islamic Sharia. According to pan-Arabist activists, the French colonial authorities sought to facilitate their takeover of the Berber tribes' property while maintaining a legal cover. 

The Berber Dahir was based on the colonial Kabyle myth, and reinforced a dichotomy in popular Moroccan historiography: the division of the country into Bled el-Makhzen—areas under the direct control of the Sultan and the Makhzen, or the state, (especially urban areas such as Fes and Rabat)—and Bled es-Siba—historically and geographically isolated areas beyond the direct control of the Makhzen (the central state composed of war-lords with Aristocratic heritage), where Amazigh languages are primarily and spoken, Arab culture and norms are not adopted and where dogmatic Islamic Sharia was not applied. However, this legislation explicitly characterized the former as "Arab" and the latter as "Berber."

The Berber Dahir gave birth to the pan-Arab pro-Islamic Moroccan nationalist movement. Protests broke out in Salé, Rabat, Fes, and Tangier, and international figures such as Shakib Arslan took it as evidence of an attempt to "de-Islamize" Morocco.

September 11, 1914 

A first formulation appeared under the influence of a group of specialists of Berbers of High Atlas and Middle Atlas, such as Maurice Le Glay (civil Controller and author of Récits de la Plaine et des Monts, Les Sentiers de la Guerre et de l'Amour, La Mort du Rougui etc.), a core of professors hostile to pan-Arabism and dogmatic Islam and in collaboration with the bishop of Rabat. The purpose of this Dahir was the recognition "Amazigh Justice," and their independence from the dispotic Arab, urban and Islamic law. The Amazigh followed their own set of laws and had been allowed to operate and evolve independently for centuries. They were able to elect the heads of their tribes on yearly circles and beheading, stoning, amputation or any brutal Islamic penalties. This Dahir recognized that independence, and formalized the French policy in Morocco under the governance of the Resident-General Lyautey who signed the Dahir of September 11, 1914.

The fundamental characteristic of this policy consisted in preserving the traditional autonomy of Berbers, primarily in the legal field, by disassociating them from the Islamic legislation or "Chrâa", and by maintaining their common law known as or "Azref". The Resident General had sultan Yusef sign the Dahir or legislative text, which gave it the force of law. The net result was that some Berber tribes were separated from the Islamic law, and made many Berber courts subject to French jurisdiction.

May 16, 1930 

The Dahir of May 16, 1930, performed a similar function to the order of September 11, 1914. There were certain clarifications under this new dahir which met with some resistance. In particular, Article 6 clarified that criminal trials were subject to French courts.

Nationalist reaction

Before arriving at the sultan, the text drafted by France was translated into Arabic. The translator, Abdellatif Sbihi, alerted nationalists from Salé. They saw it as an attempt to "divide Moroccan people", especially Article 6. On Friday, June 20, 1930, Imam Ali Haj Awad presided at the Great Mosque of Salé and read the "Latif." Robert Rezette in his book The Political Parties of Morocco wrote: the campaign against the Berber Dahir began with the recitation of "Latif" in the mosques of Sale. The Latif was a simple prayer chanted during times of calamity. At the noon service, the largest service of the week, the imam incorporated it into his sermon. On July 4, the Latif was recited under the leadership of Mohamed Lyazid, and July 5 at the mosque in Fez Quaraouiyine through Al Alam Chahbi Qorchi. It then spread to other major cities. The text of the Latif read "For our Berber brothers who are deprived of Muslim law and who can no longer live under the law and customs of their ancestors."

The goal of the nationalist movement's response to the Berber Dahir was to incite unrest against the French. The Berbers had traditionally been semi-independent, following their own set of laws and customs. However, the nationalist movement saw this dahir as an attempt to Christianize the Berbers. This was unacceptable in the largely Islamic nation of Morocco.

Sultan's reaction

The Resident-General needed to quickly suppress resistance to the dahir. He exerted pressure on Sultan Muhammad V, who issued a statement on August 11, 1930. This coincided with the celebrations of the prophet's birthday, and the Sultan's statement was read in all the mosques of the country. The Sultan denounced the nationalist movement's tactics in no uncertain terms (namely, their use of mosques as the source of their propaganda). The Sultan re-iterated his commitment to the Berber tribes, and in an attempt to combat the Latif offered an Islamic judge to any Berber tribes who wished to submit to Islamic law.

Petition against Dahir

This statement was not enough to stop the nationalists as on August 28, 1930, one hundred nationalists gathered in the house of Ahmed bin Haj Mohamed Lahrech in Salé where Mufti Boubker Zniber wrote the "Petition Against the Berber Dahir" to be sent to Grand Vizier al-Muqri by a delegation from Salé. Moroccan activists mobilized to alert the international and Arab press ; then Shakib Arslan made a brief stop in Morocco to inform and educate the nationalists.

April 8, 1934 

In 1934, another Dahir was issued, titled "Dahir regulating the functioning of justice in the tribes of Berber customs". This ministerial decree of April 8, 1934, returned the criminal courts of the Berber's to their own control, effectively undoing Article 6 of the Berber Dahir.

Reflections on the Berber Dahir 
Peaceful demonstrations spread in some parts of the country through the appeal to the "latif," and relayed by the Petition of August 28, 1930. These constituted the first organized nationalist backlash against the occupation and led to the withdrawal of France's Berber Dahir. This important historical episode strengthened the nationalist movement and was the beginning of the independence movement. It led to a new petition on January 11, 1944, called the "Manifesto of Independence".

Further reading
 Katherine E. Hoffman, Assistant Professor (PhD Columbia 2000), Language Ideologies of the French Protectorate's Native Policy in Morocco, 1912-1956 examines the ideological underpinnings and effects of French Protectorate administrative policies for categorizing the Moroccan Muslim population as Arab and Berber. The manuscript probes links between language, law, and tribe that were codified willy-nilly by Affaires Indigènes officials.
 David Bensoussan, Il était une fois le Maroc : témoignages du passé judéo-marocain, éd. du Lys, www.editionsdulys.ca, Montréal, 2010 (.) Second edition : www.iuniverse.com, Bloomington, IN, 2012, 620p.  (ebook)

External links
  Full text of the so-called Berber Dahir
 Wikisource: Berber Dahir

References and notes
Much of the content of this article comes from the equivalent French-language Wikipedia article, accessed September 7, 2006.

Berber history
1930 in Morocco
1930 in law
1930 in politics
Government documents of Morocco